Thomas Lorenz is an Austrian make-up artist and hair stylist living and working in Vienna and Paris.

Career 
Lorenz has worked with internationally renowned make-up artists such as Dick Page, Kabuki, Lisa, Eldridge, Lucia Pica, Ellis Faas and Pep Gay, and by assisting at fashion shows in New York City, Paris and Milan for brands like Hugo Boss, Comme des Garcons, Dior and Moschino.

He styled several personalities from music, film and fashion − amongst them singers Marianne Faithfull, Anna Netrebko, Mark Ronson and Robyn, actors Jessica Alba, Isabelle Huppert and Robbie Williams, models Nadja Auermann, Joséphine de La Baume, Karolina Kurkova, Amber Valletta and Emma Willis, womenswear designer Angela Missoni, lingerie designer Chantal Thomass as well as style icons such as Naomi Campbell, Jerry Hall, Anna Piaggi  or Vivienne Westwood.

Lorenz has worked with well-known photographers, such as Joachim Baldauf, Kate Bellm, Rankin or Matthew Stone. His work has been published in nearly every Austrian paper and magazine, as well as in the French, German, Indian, Italian and Russian editions of Vogue; it has also been shown in Amica, Madame, Tatler and Vogue Sposa, L'Uomo Vogue and GQ, in Elle, Glamour, Harper’s Bazaar, L'Officiel, Purple and others. As key make-up artist he has been employed at several runway shows during the fashion week in Paris − for Antonio Berardi, Edith A'gay and Fabrics Interseason. Lorenz was hired for campaigns for national and international brands such as BMW, C&A, Campari, Chivas Regal, Diesel, Escada, JOOP!, L'Oreal, Louis Vuitton, Philips, Procter & Gamble, Schwarzkopf, Silhouette, Triumph International, Universal Pictures, Villeroy & Boch. He is represented by agencies in Austria, France, Germany and India.

In 2011, Lorenz was responsible for the make-up of six characters in the Life Ball Style Bible, among them Amor, Cronus, Mars and Venus.

Accolades
 2011 Vienna Fashion Award, category Make-up Artist
 2014 Vienna Fashion Award, category Hair Stylist and Make-up Artist

References

External links
 Thomas Lorenz, Website
 Kult Artists, Hamburg
 Artist Factory, Mumbai, Paris

Living people
Year of birth missing (living people)
Austrian make-up artists
Austrian hairdressers